Bığbığ Ivy is a very old climbing plant located in Adana Province, southern Turkey.

Bığbığ Ivy is located at Meydan Yaylası (highland) of Aladağ district in Adana Province.

The plant was registered a natural monument on June 6, 1994.

References

Adana Province
Natural monuments of Turkey
Protected areas established in 1994
1994 establishments in Turkey
Aladağ, Adana
Individual trees in Turkey
Hedera